Fernando Zóbel de Ayala y Montojo Torrontegui (August 27, 1924 – June 2, 1984), also known as Fernando M. Zóbel, was a Spanish Filipino painter, businessman, art collector and museum founder.

Early life
Zóbel was born in Ermita, Manila in the Philippines to Enrique Zóbel de Ayala (1877–1943) and Fermina Montojo y Torrontegui and was a member of the prominent Zóbel de Ayala family. He was a brother of Jacobo Zóbel (father of Enrique J. Zóbel), Alfonso (father of Jaime Zóbel de Ayala) and Mercedes Zóbel McMicking, all children of his father from his first wife, Consuelo Róxas de Ayala (who died on September 25, 1907 at the age of 30). He was a nephew and namesake of Fernando Antonio Zóbel de Ayala, the eldest brother of his father.

His father was a patron of Fernando Amorsolo. In gratitude, Amorsolo would teach the young Fernando on the rudiments of art.

Zóbel took up medical studies at the University of Santo Tomas in Manila. In 1942, he had spinal deficiency that forced him to become bedridden that year. To pass the time, he took up sketching. He studied at the University of Santo Tomas and then left for Harvard University in 1946 to take up degrees in history and literature. He graduated in three years and wrote a thesis on the Federico García Lorca play The Love of Don Perlimplín and Belisa in the Garden.

Boston-style works
Zóbel started painting without formal training while in Harvard. In the fall of 1946 he met Jim Pfeufer and his wife Reed Champion Pfeufer. Reed was a painter who was loosely connected with the Boston School, and she became a mentor to the young artist. Zóbel graduated in 1949 as magna cum laude.  After finishing his bachelor's degree he briefly returned to Harvard to study law, and then worked as a curator at the Houghton Library. Zóbel's paintings from this era were representational, and often had an aspect of caricature.

Early work in Manila and the influence of Rothko
Zóbel returned to the Philippines and became friends with contemporary Filipino modernist artists. As such, he collected modernist works and set up exhibits for them to be shown and noticed since modernist art was largely unappreciated. His first one-man exhibition was held at the Philippine Art Gallery in 1953. In 1954, he left Manila for six months, had a show at the Swetzoff Gallery in Boston and enrolled at the Rhode Island School of Design where he saw an exhibition by Mark Rothko. Rothko's paintings made an impression on Zobel that increased his interest in painting abstractly. When he returned to Manila, Zobel started in having interest in Chinese and Japanese art and took up calligraphy classes until 1960. During this time, he joined the faculty of the Ateneo de Manila University and later was given an honorary doctorate and was made honorary director of the Ateneo Art Gallery for his contribution in education and as patron of the arts. To make a name for himself as a full-time painter, he later resigned from his position in the Ayala Corporation and moved to Spain.

Saetas and Serie Negra series
Zóbel is best known for his first artwork series called the Saetas. Named after the liturgical song sung in Holy Week in Spain, they were developed for the most part in the Philippines. Zóbel faced the technical problem of how to achieve the lines that his theme required, lines that were, in his own words, "long, fine, and controlled." The artist's use of a surgical syringe to eject fine lines of paint was a hallmark of this series. After the Saetas, Zóbel began a series called Serie Negra or Series in Black influenced by Chinese Calligraphy. The Serie Negra was started in 1959 in Madrid and continued for four years.

Later life and death
He founded the Museo de Arte Abstracto Español at Casa Colgadas in the town of Cuenca, Spain in 1963. The museum was expanded in 1978, and in 1980 Zóbel donated its collection to the Fundación Juan March, which then incorporated it into its own collection.

Zóbel was a mentor and collector who aided the careers of Spanish modernist painters including Antonio Lorenzo, Antoni Tàpies, Eusebio Sempere, Martín Chirino López, Antonio Saura and many others. In the late 1960s and early 1970s, Zóbel was working on a series of paintings called Dialogos which were his abstracted variations on paintings he admired in museums. He also made a series of paintings inspired by the Júcar River. After suffering a stroke that left him slightly impaired, he created a series called Las Orillas that elaborated on the theme of rivers.

In 1983, King Juan Carlos of Spain bestowed upon Zóbel, the Gold Medal of Merit in the Fine Arts, a prestigious award to individuals or institutions who have promoted the Spanish arts and culture. Soon after, Zóbel died of a heart attack while traveling in Rome, Italy on June 2, 1984 at the age of 59.

Legacy 
Since Zóbel's passing in 1984, the Ateneo Art Gallery in the Philippines and the Museo de Arte Abstracto Español in Spain, have since become hallmarks of Spanish and Philippine modern and contemporary art.

In 1967, the Ayala Museum originally envisioned by Zóbel to be a museum for Philippine history and iconography was established by the Filipinas Foundation (present-day Ayala Foundation).

In 2003, a retrospective was held at the Museo Nacional Centro de Arte Reina Sofía in Madrid. The exhibition had a special exhibition tour at the Casa Museo Zavala in Cuenca and the Sala de Exposiciones de la Caja de San Fernando in Seville.

On May 21, 2006, Zóbel was posthumously awarded the Presidential Medal of Merit by the Philippine President Gloria Macapagal Arroyo for his contributions in the arts.

From November 15, 2022 to March 5, 2023, "The Future of the Past," an exhibit that pays tribute to the legacy of Zóbel, takes place in the Museo Del Prado, in collaboration with Fundacion Juan March and Ayala Foundation.

Record prices at auction 
Since the 2010s, works by Zóbel have achieved record prices at auctions with the growth of the Philippine art market. On April 6, 2013, Hattecvm, a work from 1949 previously in a European private collection was sold for a record of PHP43.460 million (US$1,056,082) at a Sotheby's auction in Hong Kong. This was subsequently followed by a record price set in May 25, 2013 by Aracili, a similar work from 1959 that sold for PHP37.467 million (US$900,773.20) at a Christie's auction in Hong Kong.
 
Since then, his works have consistently increased in prices at auction in the Philippines and overseas. In 2015, Seated Man (Nothing III), an early 1953 work by Zóbel in the collection of his longtime friends Jim and Reed Pfeufer was sold at the Leon Gallery auction in Manila for a record PHP30.368 million.

Subsequently, this record has been broken a 1959 work titled Saeta 52 (Pared Madrileña) from the Saeta series sold for PHP 35.040 million at a Leon Gallery auction in Manila on September 8, 2018. On November 30, 2019, a 1962 work by Zobel titled Perales de Tajuña was sold at Leon Gallery Fine Art and Antiques in Manila for a reached similar result for PHP 35.040 million.

On 10 September 2022, Siga-Siga, an early 1952 work by Zóbel that previously was in the collection of his nephew Enrique Zóbel was sold at the Leon Gallery auction in Manila for a world record price of PHP44.384 million. The winning bidder was revealed to be Iñigo Zóbel, son of Enrique and great nephew of the artist.

Bibliography 
 Sangro, Antonio M. (2015), Zobel: Paintings and Drawings, Zóbel: Pintura y dibujos, Galera Cayon, Madrid, 
 Perez, Rod Paras (1990), Fernando Zobel, Eugenio Lopez Foundation, Inc., Manila.
 Madero, Rafael, et al., (2003), Zobel, Museo Nacional Centro de Arte Reina Sofía, Madrid,

External links
 Official Website of Fernando Zóbel (Spanish)
 Harvard Magazine: A Brief Biography of Fernando Zóbel de Ayala

References

Ateneo de Manila University alumni
Spanish artists
1924 births
1984 deaths
Harvard College alumni
Academic staff of Ateneo de Manila University
Filipino painters
Filipino people of German descent
Filipino people of Spanish descent
Filipino people of Basque descent
Fernando
People from Ermita
20th-century Spanish painters
20th-century Spanish male artists
Spanish male painters
Recipients of the Presidential Medal of Merit (Philippines)
Filipino emigrants to Spain
Filipino expatriates in the United States